The Tower of Botafuegos (Spanish: Torre de Botafuegos) is a tower located in Los Barrios, Spain. It was declared Bien de Interés Cultural in 1993.

References 

Bien de Interés Cultural landmarks in the Province of Cádiz
Towers in Spain